Buckwheat tea, known as memil-cha in Korea, soba-cha in Japan, and  kuqiao-cha in China, is a tea made from roasted buckwheat. Like other traditional Korean teas, memil-cha can be drunk either warm or cold and is sometimes served in place of water. Recently, tartari buckwheat grown in Gangwon Province is popular for making memil-cha, as it is nuttier and contains more rutin.

Preparation 
Buckwheat is husked, cooked, and dried then pan-fried without oil. For one part of buckwheat, ten parts of water are used.  of roasted buckwheat is added to  water and infused for 2–4 minutes.

See also 
 Bori-cha – barley tea
 Hyeonmi-cha – brown rice tea
 Oksusu-cha – corn tea
 Roasted grain beverage
 List of buckwheat dishes

References 

Herbal tea
Korean tea
Buckwheat dishes